Hermógenes Leonel Guevara Mora, better known as Hermógenes L. Mora (born 19 April 1979 in Chinandega) is a Nicaraguan poet and writer.

Biography 
An avid reader since his childhood, Mora has always been an admirer of Rubén Darío. He has lived in El Viejo, León, and later  San José, Costa Rica and Panama City, Panama.

In his poetry and stories he crudely describes the reality faced by his people.

Selected works 
 Tortura psicológica, crónica de un inmigrante (2022)
 Entre dos mundos (2021)
 Seis relatos para una tarde y una taza de café (2021) ISBN 978-9962136859
 Tabúes y realidades (utopías en versos) (2020) ISBN 978-9962135418
 Un plan para escapar (2019) ISBN 978-9962-12-961-5

References

External links 
 Hermógenes L. Mora - Revista Ágrafos 
 Author Hermógenes L. Mora - Agencia ISBN Panamá

1979 births
Living people
People from Chinandega
21st-century Nicaraguan writers
21st-century Nicaraguan poets
Nicaraguan male poets
Nicaraguan expatriates in Panama